Alois Hudec (12 July 1908 – 23 January 1997) was a Czechoslovak gymnast and an individual World and Olympic Champion in the sport.

He competed for Czechoslovakia at the 1936 Summer Olympics in Berlin, where he received a gold medal in rings. Part of his performance there is recorded in an 85-second shot in Leni Riefenstahl's film Olympia.  He also competed at three World Championships in a row (1931, 1934, 1938) where he won the rings title every time.

Hudec also bears another particular distinction within the annals of the history of the sport.  Although the 1931 World Artistic Gymnastics Championships often seem to go ignored by various authorities within the sport, the FIG, in their 125-Year Anniversary Publication, refers to them as the "First Artistic Men's World Championships".  As he became the overall World All-Around Champion at those games, according to some authorities, Hudec could be considered the first-ever World All-Around Champion in the sport of Men's Artistic Gymnastics.

References

External links
 
 
 

1908 births
1997 deaths
Czechoslovak male artistic gymnasts
Gymnasts at the 1936 Summer Olympics
Olympic gymnasts of Czechoslovakia
Olympic gold medalists for Czechoslovakia
Olympic medalists in gymnastics
Medalists at the 1936 Summer Olympics
People from Vyškov District
Sportspeople from the South Moravian Region